The year 1944 in television involved some significant events.
Below is a list of television-related events during 1944.



Events
May 22 – The US Federal Communications Commission (FCC) increases its limits for single ownership of television stations from three to five.
May 25 – First commercial U.S. telecast by relay. Eddie Cantor is broadcast from NBC's Manhattan station WNBT to Philco's Philadelphia station WPTZ, via an automatic relay tower halfway between the two cities. (The AT&T corporation's coaxial cable between the cities is unavailable because of the war.) NBC stops broadcasting Cantor in the middle of his rendition of the song "We're Having a Baby, My Baby and Me" when it finds some of the lyrics and his gestures "objectionable."
 August 16 
 Paris télévision – Fernsehsender Paris stops broadcasting. Broadcasting is resumed by the new French government in October 1944 under the name Télévision française with the same technical equipment.
 John Logie Baird demonstrates the world's first color television picture tube. Color movies are shown from a flying-spot scanner.

Debuts
The War As It Happens, an early news show debuts (1944-1945)
At Home, variety series (1944-1945)
Missus Goes a Shopping, a game series, premieres (1944–1949)
The World in Your Home, an educational series, (1944–1948)
Opinions on Trial, a discussion series (1944-1945?)
Will You Remember?, a music series (1944-1945)

Television shows

Births
January 4 - Jim Bohannon, broadcaster (died 2022)
January 6 - Bonnie Franklin, actress and director, One Day at a Time (died 2013)
January 10 - William Sanderson, actor, Newhart, Deadwood, True Blood
January 19 - Shelley Fabares, actress and singer, The Donna Reed Show, Coach
January 21 - Keith Strachan, composer
January 23 - Rutger Hauer, Dutch actor (died 2019)
January 28 - Susan Howard, American actress
February 3 - Trisha Noble, Australian singer and actress (died 2021)
February 8 
Roger Lloyd-Pack, English actor (died 2014)
Richard Durden, English actor
February 13 
Stockard Channing, actress, The West Wing
Michael Ensign, American actor
Jerry Springer, American television-judge, broadcaster, journalist, actor, producer, and former lawyer and politician
February 17 - Nick Hewer, English television presenter
February 28 - Kelly Bishop, actress, Gilmore Girls
February 29
Sharon Hugueny, actress (died 1996)
Dennis Farina, actor, Crime Story, Law & Order (died 2013)
Phyllis Frelich, actress (died 2014)
March 3 - Lee Holdridge, composer
March 10 - Richard Gant, actor
March 17 - Petra Markham, actress
March 22 - Michael Zinberg, writer
March 24 - R. Lee Ermey, actor and drill instructor (died 2018)
March 26 - Diana Ross, singer and actress
March 28 - Ken Howard, actor, The White Shadow (died 2016)
April 1 - Frank Gari, singer
April 3 - Tony Orlando, singer
April 4 - Craig T. Nelson, actor, Coach, The District, Parenthood
April 6 - Judith McConnell, actress
April 7 
oshik levi, Israeli singer and actor
Warner Fusselle, sportscaster
April 8 - Hywel Bennett, Welsh actor, Shelley (died 2017)
April 10 - Vin Di Bona, producer
April 20 - Cuba Gooding Sr., singer (died 2017)
April 25 - Len Goodman, English professional, Dancing with the Stars
April 29 
Richard Kline, actor and director, Three's Company
Michael Angelis, actor (died 2020)
April 30 - Jill Clayburgh, actress (died 2010)
May 5 - John Rhys-Davies, Welsh actor, Sliders
May 14 - George Lucas, director and producer
May 16 - Danny Trejo, actor
May 23 - Ronald L. Schwary, producer
May 24 - Patti LaBelle, singer and actress
May 25 
Frank Oz, actor and puppeteer
John Bunnell, host
May 28 -  Patricia Quinn, actress
June 2 - Marvin Hamlisch, composer
June 4 - Michelle Phillips, singer and actress
June 20 - John McCook, actor, The Bold and the Beautiful
June 21 - Tony Scott, actor (died 2012)
June 25 - Gary David Goldberg, producer (died 2013)
June 29 - Gary Busey, actor
June 30 - Terry Funk, actor
July 8
Jeffrey Tambor, actor, The Larry Sanders Show, Arrested Development, Transparent
Janet Sheen, actress
July 12 - Denise Nicholas, actress, Room 222, In the Heat of the Night
July 15 - Jan-Michael Vincent, actor, Airwolf (died 2019)
July 22 - Peter Jason, actor
July 31 - Geraldine Chaplin, actress
August 1 - Christopher Lewis, screenwriter (died 2021)
August 2 - Joanna Cassidy, actress
August 4 - Richard Belzer, actor, Homicide: Life on the Street, Law & Order: Special Victims Unit (died 2023)
August 7
John Glover, actor, Smallville
David Rasche, actor, Sledge Hammer!
August 9 - Sam Elliott, actor
August 11 - Ian McDiarmid, Scottish actor
August 13 - Kevin Tighe, actor, Emergency!
August 25 - Anthony Heald, actor, Boston Public
August 27 
Barbara Trentham, actress (died 2013)
G. W. Bailey, actor
August 30 - Molly Ivins, author (died 2007)
September 1 - Beau Starr, actor
September 6 - Swoosie Kurtz, actress, Sisters
September 13 - Jacqueline Bisset, English actress
September 16 - Linda Kaye Henning, actress, Petticoat Junction
September 21 - Fannie Flagg, actress, Match Game
September 25 
Michael Douglas, actor, producer, The Streets of San Francisco
Eugenia Zukerman, American flutist
September 27 
Angélica María, actress
Steven Robman, American television and theatre director/producer
September 28 - Matthew Cowles, actor
September 29 - Mike Post, composer
October 15 - Haim Saban, American composer
October 28
Dennis Franz, actor, NYPD Blue
Alyce Cleese, talk show host
November 4 -  Linda Gary, American actress, voice actress, Spider-Man (died 1995)
November 12 - Al Michaels, sportscaster
November 16 - Jay Hammer, actor, Guiding Light
November 17 
Danny DeVito, actor, director and producer, Taxi, It's Always Sunny in Philadelphia
Lorne Michaels, screenwriter
Gary Goldman, screenwriter
November 20 - John Pasquin, television director
November 21 
Harold Ramis, actor (died 2014)
Marcy Carsey, American television producer
November 25 - Ben Stein, television actor
November 27 - Gregory Hoblit, television director
December 2 - Cathy Lee Crosby, actress and host, That's Incredible!
December 6 - Kit Culkin, actor
December 11
Teri Garr, actress
Lynda Day George, actress, Mission: Impossible
Susan Blanchard, actress, All My Children
December 17 - Bernard Hill, English actor
December 19 - Tim Reid, actor, Sister, Sister
December 31 - Neil Ross, voice actor

References

 
TV